Ridgley may refer to:

Places
Ridgley, Missouri, U.S. 
Ridgley, Tasmania, Australia

People

Given name
Francis Ridgley Cotton (1895–1960), American prelate of the Roman Catholic Church
Ridgley C. Powers (1836–1912), Union officer in the American Civil War and a Mississippi politician
William Ridgley Morris (1811–1889), American politician and diplomat

Surname
Bob Ridgley (fl. 2003–2011), Canadian politician
Buck Ridgley, American Negro league baseball player in the 1920s
Henry Ridgley (1635–1710), an early settler of Maryland, U.S.
Ishbel MacDonald (1903–1982), also known as Ishbel Ridgley, daughter of British prime minister Ramsay MacDonald
Sammy Ridgley (born 1943), American activist and R&B artist 
Thomas Ridgley (c. 1667–1734), English independent theologian
Tommy Ridgley (1925–1999), American R&B singer and bandleader

See also

Ridgeley (disambiguation)
Ridgely (disambiguation)
Ridgley Methodist Episcopal Church, in Landover, Prince George's County, Maryland, U.S.